William James Farrer (3 April 184516 April 1906) was a leading English Australian agronomist and plant breeder. Farrer is best remembered as the originator of the "Federation" strain of wheat, distributed in 1903. His work resulted in significant improvements in both the quality and crop yields of Australia's national wheat harvest, a contribution for which he earned the title 'father of the Australian wheat industry'.

Early years

Farrer was born on 3 April 1845 in the town of Docker, Westmorland in the English north west (now Cumbria). The son of Thomas Farrer, a tenant farmer, and his wife Sarah William, William Farrer was selected for a scholarship at Christ's Hospital, London where he was awarded a gold and silver medal for mathematics and soon earned a scholarship to Pembroke College where, after earning a B.A. at Pembroke College, Cambridge in 1868, Farrer emigrated to Australia in 1870. A sufferer of tuberculosis, Farrer hoped to find Australia's drier warmer climate more agreeable to his then delicate medical condition.

Initially, Farrer lived with friends at Parramatta but was later employed as a tutor in Duntroon, then in regional New South Wales (now part of the Australian Capital Territory). In 1873 he published Grass and Sheep-farming A Paper: Speculative and Suggestive which dealt with the suitability of various soils for grasses and the scientific side of sheep-farming. After working as a tutor on George Campbell's sheep station at Duntroon, he qualified as a surveyor in 1875. Farrer worked for the Department of Lands in wheat growing districts of NSW from 1875–1886.

In 1882 Farrer married Henrietta Nina, the only daughter of Leopold Fane de Salis, the then Member of Parliament for Queanbeyan, NSW. Four years later De Salis gifted to Nina alone, 97 hectares of land. A farm rather than a station "Lambrigg" (named for Farrer's home district), formerly part of "Cuppacumbalong"", was located on the Murrumbidgee River, near Tharwa in the present day Australian Capital Territory. Farrer's initial attempts at establishing a vineyard were thwarted as the soil proved unsuitable and he turned his attention to wheat cultivation. His goal was to produce a good loaf of bread. He would consider himself a scientific gardener.

Lambrigg experiments

The Wheat leaf rust disease had a major impact on both the quality and yields of wheat harvests throughout the colonies. Farrer applied his scientific knowledge to developing wheat hybrids, initially applying cross-pollination techniques to create rust immune strains of wheat. He readily improvised using hairpins to transfer pollen until he could obtain forceps. His scientific experiments continued over 20 years, and consisted of long days of planting and developing wheat strains. He used Gregor Mendel's methods in his work. Frederick Bickell Guthrie developed small-scale procedures that emulated a flour-mill and bakehouse; Farrer used these to assess the yield from the wheat strains. The results of his experiments are recorded in handwriting notebooks.
To add to his knowledge of other breeders work he corresponded all over the world. He kept up a connection with a French wheat breeder, Henri Vilmorin, who was breeding wheat for dry areas. He also corresponded with plant breeders working in India.

Concurrently, Farrer worked on developing a strain of wheat that could resist bunt or smut-ball, another devastating enemy of wheat.

By selective breeding of varieties such as "Professor Blount's Hybrid No.38, Gypsum", Canadian Fife, Etawah and Purple Straw, Farrer aimed to produce a wheat cultivar that had the best qualities of each. Success in developing a rust-resistant, high-yielding strain greeted him in 1900, when a satisfactory series of wheat was finally obtained – the Federation strain, named after the imminent Federation of Australia. He then developed a series of other strains such as Canberra, Firbank, Cleveland, Pearlie White (named after a child in the neighbourhood who was very interested in his work) and Florence (resistant to flag smut). His successes led Farrer to become a wheat experimentalist with the NSW Department of Agriculture in 1898.

These wheat strains led to a major improvement to Australia's wheat industry within a few years. The Federation strain was released to Australian farmers in 1903 and resulted in a trebling of Australia's wheat harvest over a period of twenty years. Wheat export was to become a world class enterprise.

Death and legacy

Farrer died at his home Lambrigg in 1906 after suffering a major heart attack, and was buried on his property at dusk the next day.

In 1911 the Farrer Memorial Trust was established in his memory, initially providing scholarships for Agricultural studies. In 1936 the trust commenced awarding a medal for outstanding service to agricultural science. The first recipient of the medal was then Prime Minister of Australia and Tasmanian farmer, Joseph Lyons. A statue of Farrer was erected in Queanbeyan by the Federal government in 1935 and another at Lambrigg in 1938.

A suburb and a primary school in Canberra have been named in his honour. The school's logo is a wheat sheaf and the sports houses are named after his most famous types of wheat. An Australian electoral division has been named after him, and Farrer was also remembered on the reverse of the Australian two-dollar banknote issued in 1966 (now withdrawn). A specialist agricultural high school (Farrer Memorial Agricultural High School, Tamworth NSW) was named in his honour and continues to provide specialist agricultural education. There is also a hall of residence at Monash University named in his honour.

William Farrer is also remembered in Wagga Wagga with the Farrer Hotel and the Farrer Football League (Australian rules football).

References

Additional sources listed by the "Australian Dictionary of Biography":
A. Russell, William James Farrer, a Biography (Melb, 1949); E. J. Donath, William Farrer (Melb, 1970); Lone Hand, Sept 1910, p 419; Department of Agriculture (New South Wales), Science Bulletin, 1922, no 22; RAHSJ, 22 (1936–37), p 406; Australian Institute of Agricultural Science, Journal, 21 (1939), p 208; Records of the Australian Academy of Science, 4 (Nov 1978 – Apr 79), no 1, p 7.

External links

 William Farrer on the Australian $2 note (in circulation between 1966-1988)

1845 births
1906 deaths
Australian farmers
Australian agronomists
People from Westmorland
English emigrants to colonial Australia
Botanists active in Australia
19th-century Australian scientists
Australian horticulturists
Burials in the Australian Capital Territory